Erik Lindgren (20 December 1902 – 23 July 1973) was a Swedish international ice hockey defender and bandy player. He represented Sweden men's national ice hockey team in the 1931 World Ice Hockey Championships.

Career
Born in Stockholm, Lindgren represented Djurgården between 1925 and 1934. He became Swedish champion in 1926. 1934–35, he played for IK Göta.

Lindgren played with Djurgårdens IF Bandy 1930–32.

References

External links 
 

1902 births
1973 deaths
Djurgårdens IF Bandy players
Djurgårdens IF Hockey players
IK Göta Ishockey players
Swedish bandy players
Swedish ice hockey players
Ice hockey people from Stockholm